Cedarville is a ghost town in Stevens County, Washington, United States. The town is located in the deer trail district of southern Stevens County. Cedarville was also called Cedar Canyon. The town was founded in the 1890s following the discovery of silver in the area. By 1897 the town had a hotel owned by the Smiths, Diamond's general store, a livery stable, a log school house, and no less than 4 saloons. By the time the population reached 300, Cedar Canyon became known as Cedarville. For 18 years Cedarville was a mining town. By 1911 the silver had become depleted and Cedarville became deserted. Today it is a ghost town.

References

Ghost towns in Washington (state)
Ghost towns in Stevens County, Washington